Hugh James Arbuthnott, CMG (born 27 December 1936) is a retired British diplomat.

Son of James Gordon Arbuthnott and Margaret Georgiana, née Hyde. Married to Vanessa Rose Dyer, has three sons, Dominic Hugh, Justin Edward James (died 1989), and Giles Sebastian.

Educated at Ampleforth College and New College, Oxford, Arbuthnott was also a 2nd Lieutenant in Black Watch. He then joined HM Foreign (subsequently Diplomatic) Service during the years of 1960–96.  Arbuthnott then served as the Head of European Integration Department (External), FCO, from 1974 to 1978.  As well, Arbuthnott served in Paris as Counsellor (Agricultural &  Economic), and then as Head of Chancery 1978–83.

Between 1986 and 1989, he was HM Ambassador to Romania. As Ambassador, in 1989, he attempted to personally send a letter to the dissident Doina Cornea at her home in the Transylvanian city of Cluj-Napoca. Securitate officers prevented him to do this, "pushing and manhandling" him, a behaviour that Britain described as "outrageous". The official response of the Romanian authorities was that Hugh Arbuthnott "infringed traffic regulations" and that Cornea's activities were an internal matter of Romania.

Between 1989 and 1993 he was the Ambassador to Portugal and between 1993 and 1996 to Denmark.

He is a coauthor of

Honours
 Order of St Michael and St George, 1983

References

External links

1936 births
Living people
Black Watch officers
Companions of the Order of St Michael and St George
Hugh James Arbuthnott
Alumni of New College, Oxford
People educated at Ampleforth College
Ambassadors of the United Kingdom to Romania
Ambassadors of the United Kingdom to Portugal
Ambassadors of the United Kingdom to Denmark
British expatriates in France